Bulavynske is an urban-type settlement in the Horlivka Raion, Donetsk Oblast (province) of eastern Ukraine. Population:

Demographics
Native language as of the Ukrainian Census of 2001:
 Ukrainian 16.98%
 Russian 82.75%
 Belarusian 0.05%
 Moldovan (Romanian), Armenian, Polish and Jewish 0.03%

References

Urban-type settlements in Horlivka Raion